Mermaid's Pool to Rowden Gut is a geological Site of Special Scientific Interest (SSSI) in north-western Devon in England. It comprises a 5.5km-long stretch of coast between Mermaid's Pool in the north-east and Rowden's Gut in the south-west. The sea cliffs expose the only available complete sequence through the Bideford Formation of the Culm Measures, which consists of alternating layers of mudstones, siltstones and sandstones  that were deposited in a wide range of deltaic environments during the Carboniferous period. This site borders the Westward Ho! Cliffs SSSI to the north, while the coastline to the south-east continues to Peppercombe, and further into the Hobby to Peppercombe SSSI.

Mermaid's Pool is a little pool in the shore platform a mile west of Westward Ho! It borders on a reef of hard sandstone which stands out against the surrounding gullies formed of easily eroded softer mudstone, now covered in algae. Several minor faults are visible along the length of the reef. There is bladder wrack growing in the area supporting a population of flat periwinkles, which are otherwise not found on the rocky platforms to the east in Westward Ho!

References

Bibliography 

Sites of Special Scientific Interest in Devon
Sites of Special Scientific Interest notified in 1996